Meanjin is an Australian literary magazine based in Melbourne.

Meanjin may also refer to:
 Meanjin, the Indigenous Australian name for the city of Brisbane
 Meanjin (EP), a 2022 extended play by Thelma Plum